Jayanta Bhatta ( CE –  CE) was a Kashmiri poet, teacher, logician, and an advisor to King Sankaravarman. He was a philosopher of the Nyaya school of Hindu philosophy. He authored three works on Nyāya philosophy: one of which is not known, an allegorical drama, and a commentary on Pāṇinian grammar.

Early life
Jayanta was born into a wealthy Brahmin family. He was a child prodigy, composing a commentary to Panini’s Ashtadhyayi and earned the name Nava-Vrittikara, or new commentator. Later in life, he mastered various shastra and agama, distinguished himself in scholarly debates, and passed his knowledge on to his students. 

Jayanta's birth year, lifespan, dates of his written works are a subject of scholarly debates. His philosophical work Nyāyamañjarī as well as his drama Āgamaḍambara, refer to King Sankaravarman (883 – 902 CE) as a contemporary.  

Kādambarikathāsāra, a work written by Jayanta's son Abhinanda, mentions that Jayanta's great grandfather was a minister of king Lalitaditya Muktapida, who was a ruler of the Karkota dynasty in the second quarter of the 8th century CE. Several attempts to specify his life span are based on references to his work by other authors and references to contemporary events and individuals in his work. They range from the middle of the 8th century CE to the start of the 10th century CE. However, most reliable estimates place him around the 9th century CE.

Lineage
Kādambarikathāsāra provides some information about Jayanta's lineage. It says his ancestor Shakti was a Brahmin and a direct patriline descendant of Bharadwaja gotra from the Gauda region, who lived in Darvabhisara, near the border of Kashmir. His son was named Mitra, and his grandson was Saktisvämin (Shaktisvamin). 

Saktisvämin, the great grandfather of Jayanta, was a minister of Kashmir Lalitaditya Muktapida of the Karkota dynasty ( – 761 CE). Jayanta mentions in Nyayamanjari that his grandfather obtained a village named Gauramulaka, believed to have been located north of the modern town of Rajouri, from King Muktapida. Saktisvämin had a son named Chandra, Jayanta's father.

Career 
The Agamadambara provides details about Bhatta's political career. He was an adviser to Kashmiri king Sankaravarman. In his position, he played a role in banishing the Nilambara (Black-Blankets) sect from Kashmir. Commenting on Tantric literature, he argued that the Nilambara sect promoted "immoral teachings". Jayanta claimed the Nilambara "wear simply one blue garment, and then as a group engages in unconstrained public sex". He argued that this practice was "unnecessary" and threatened the fundamental values of society.

Works

Philosophical works
Jayanta wrote three known treatises on Nyaya philosophy, of which two survive. His first, the Nyayamanjari (A Cluster of Flowers of the Nyaya tree) is a commentary on Nyaya-aphorisms that serves as a critique of the theories of rival philosophical systems like the Mīmānsādarśana.

His second, the Nyayakalika (A Bud of the Nyaya tree) is an overview of the basic tenets of the Nyāya Sūtras, a foundational text of the Nyaya school.  His third work, Pallava (probably Nyayapallava, A Twig of the Nyaya tree) though quoted in Syadvadaratnakara, has not survived.

Jayanta mentions in Nyayamanjari that he wrote this treatise during his confinement in a forest by the king. This treatise is unique because it is an independent work, not a commentary of an earlier work. 

Secondly, according to Jayanta, the purpose of Nyaya is to protect the authority of the Vedas, Hinduism's oldest scriptures, whereas earlier Nyaya scholars considered Nyaya to be an Anvikshiki (scientific study) providing true knowledge about the real nature of the objects of cognition.

Literary works 
The hero of his quasi-philosophical drama is a young graduate of the Mimansa school, who wants to defeat all opponents of Vedas through reasoning.

Philosophy

God 
The discussion of God's Existence is found in part 1 of Nyaya Manjuri. Jayanta adheres to a realist viewpoint of God and the world and defends the possibility of reasoned arguments favoring God as a realistic and adequate cause of the world.

Criticism of Lokayats 
Jayanta Bhatta criticized the Lokayata school of philosophy for not developing a Lokayata culture. He said, "The Lokayata is not an Agama. viz. not a guide to cultural living, not a system of do's and don’ts; hence it is nothing but irresponsible wrangling."

English translations

See also 
 Nyaya

References 

 9th-century Indian philosophers
 Kashmiri people
 Kashmiri writers
 Poets from Jammu and Kashmir
 9th-century Indian writers
 Indian logicians
 Nyaya
 Year of death unknown
 Year of birth unknown
 Indian male writers
 Scholars from Jammu and Kashmir
Sanskrit dramatists and playwrights